Personal and Vehicular Basic Loads and The Morrow Project Role Playing Expansion is a 1983 role-playing game supplement published by Timeline for The Morrow Project.

Contents
Personal and Vehicular Basic Loads and The Morrow Project Role Playing Expansion is a supplement to help players and project directors to know how to determine whether a character knew a certain fact, could repair a certain item, or could carry out a task.

Reception
William A. Barton reviewed Morrow Project Role Playing Expansion and Personal and Vehicular Basic Loads in The Space Gamer No. 63. Barton commented that "If you prefer the original Morrow system, or you've already adapted a skill system from another game, you may not find this supplement worth buying. If not, you may wish to look into the TMP RP Expansion - but be ready to cover its gaps yourself."

References

Role-playing game supplements introduced in 1983
The Morrow Project supplements